Cadaba aphylla ("Swartstorm") is one of the many species in the genus Cadaba. It is indigenous to southern Africa.

Description

It grows as a straggly, perennial shrub or small tree, virgate, much-branched, dark green, often with purple bloom, and usually leafless, and may reach 2 meters in height. Its branches are somewhat succulent and frequently spine-tipped. Leaves of some 10 x 2 mm are found on seedlings and young branchlets.

Its deep-red flowers (rarely yellow) in axillary clusters have prominently exserted stamens, making this a colourful plant in summer. Fruits are some 90 mm in length, green at first, turning a rusty brown when mature, and covered in sticky hairs. A sticky orange pulp covers the small black seeds.

Distribution
This species may occur in dry bushveld or semidesert conditions from tropical Africa to Namibia, Zimbabwe, Botswana, and South Africa. 
At its southern extent, it occurs in clay-rich soils in the Little Karoo and Overberg regions, as far south-west as the town of Montagu.

References

External links
Distribution map

aphylla